The 1967 Morgan State Bears football team was an American football team that represented Morgan State College in the Central Intercollegiate Athletic Association (CIAA) during the 1967 NCAA College Division football season. In their eighth season under head coach Earl Banks, the Bears compiled a perfect 8–0 record, won the CIAA championship, and outscored all opponents by a total of 285 to 78. 

The Bears were recognized by the New Pittsburgh Courier as the 1967 black college national co-champion. They were also ranked No. 9 in the final Associated Press 1967 College Division rankings.

Schedule

References

Morgan State
Morgan State Bears football seasons
Black college football national champions
College football undefeated seasons
Morgan State Bears football